John Darling and Son was an Australian wheat merchant and flour milling company founded in Adelaide, South Australia, for many years the largest in Australia.

It was founded by John Darling Sr. (1831–1905), a businessman of Scottish origin, and Member of Parliament for 25 years. He was succeeded by his eldest son, John Darling, Jr. (1852–1914), also a Member of Parliament, then by Harold Gordon Darling. It was registered as a private company in Victoria in 1953 with three directors: Norman Darling, Leonard Darling, and Leonard Gordon Darling.

Origin
John Darling (23 February 1831 – 10 April 1905) was born in Edinburgh, Scotland, in 1831, second son of John Darling of Duns, into a family of modest means, and was educated at George Heriot's School. His father died when he was 10, and he was forced to leave school at the age of 11.

His first job was as an office boy at the printing shop of Balfour & Jack, but lost that job after six or eight weeks. He next worked at Duncan Sinclair and Sons' type foundry "Whitford House", then at Alexander Wilson & Son, followed by James Marr, Gallie, & Co., where he worked for about 12 years. Several of his friends, including Alexander Dowie and Joseph Ferguson, later an owner of The Register, had emigrated to South Australia in 1851, and realizing the lack of opportunities for advancement in Edinburgh, decided to follow them. He was not a wealthy man, and did not qualify for assisted passage, so it took some time before they emigrated.

Business
Early in 1855 he, his wife and two sons arrived at Semaphore, South Australia in the "Isabella",sailing from Leith. Four days later he was working in the Rundle Street store of Berry & Gall. This job did not last long, but through a friend he soon found employment with baker Robert Birrell of Grenfell Street. This job lasted two years before he left to earn a living with a horse and cart, and at the same time helped set up his wife in a store adjacent to the Stag Inn on Rundle Street. This failed to attract much custom so they built a shop "Millbrook Store" on Glen Osmond Road, which slowly became profitable. Meanwhile, he had been approached by James Smith, of Giles & Smith, Waymouth Street who had a flour mill on West Terrace and in the five years in their employ learned the wheat and flour business. He then resigned from Giles and Smith, and in 1865 was trading independently. In 1867 he took over the sole management of the grain stores in Waymouth Street formerly owned by R. G. Bowen (later to become the factory of D & W. Murray).

In 1872 he made his eldest son John Darling, jun. a partner in the business, thereafter known as J. Darling & Son, millers, grain, and general merchants. For 30 years the business grew steadily, the "Grain King" setting up branches throughout South Australia's wheat belt, buying up flour mills then establishing agencies in Melbourne in 1880 and London, his company handling most of Australia's export grain.

He retired from the business in October 1897, leaving John Darling, Jr., as sole proprietor. He died of sudden heart failure at the family home "Thurloo" on Kent Terrace, Kent Town. Under John Darling, Jr., the company purchased the Eclipse flour mills, Port Adelaide, and the goodwill of J. Dunn and Co. in ???. He founded a hay-compressing business in Gawler, near the railway station.

He died in a Melbourne private hospital on 27 March 1914. He had been in that city a few days to chair a meeting of BHP, when he took ill.

Shipping
In 1884 the company had Murdoch and Murray, of Port Glasgow build the coastal steamer Jessie Darling to carry grain from the ports of South Australia to Adelaide and Melbourne. An image of the ship may be seen here. The Jessie Darling was involved in a number of marine accidents; the most serious being a bizarre sequence of events on the morning of 21 April 1907. Around 2am the four-masted barque Norma, loaded with wheat, was lying at the Semaphore anchorage off Outer Harbor, awaiting a favourable wind, when it was struck by the steamer Ardencraig, inbound with merchandise from London. Both vessels sank, with one crew member drowned. Hours later, in broad daylight, the Jessie Darling, loaded with wheat from Smoky Bay, struck the wreck of the Norma and sank. On 4 May the inbound steamer Port Chalmers ran into the submerged wrecks and suffered some damage. At the inquest, Capt. Thomas of the Ardencraig asserted that a sudden rain squall had obscured the Norma, and the crew backed his statement. The story was not believed, but couldn't be disproved; Thomas never again had such a responsible position. Years later a story emerged that the lights of the Norma actually had been seen but the  Ardencraig could not be halted due to the topping maul (a mallet used for quick release of anchor chains etc.) being misplaced, and the anchors could not be dropped in time.

The Jessie Darling was refloated in January 1908 repaired and put back in service in November. Meanwhile, the Grace Darling had been purchased as her replacement went into service in March 1908.

The Templemore, a ship he chartered to carry wheat to Britain was wrecked in 1893.

She was also carrying John Darling's wheat.

In 1890 the Jessie Darling took part in a profitable salvage operation – from the wreck of the Glenrosa. As the Coorabie with an oil engine, it was still doing useful work in 1940.

Other ships owned by the company were the Palmerston and the Emu. and the Avoca.

Third generation
John Darling jr had four sons:
John Darling III ( – ) fell out of a tree at the age of 18 and broke his back and his brother Harold took upon the responsibilities of the running of the business with brother Leonard.
Leonard ( – )
Joe Darling (21 November 1870 – 2 January 1946) was Australian Cricket Test Captain from 1897 to 1905
Harold Gordon Darling – see biography below. During his time the family business was transferred from Adelaide to ?? King Street, Melbourne, with flour mills at Albion in Melbourne and Rhodes in Sydney.

Harold Gordon Darling
Harold Gordon Darling (9 June 1885 – 26 January 1950) was the eldest son of John Darling, Jr. Educated at Prince Alfred College, he entered the family business of John Darling and Son, grain merchants, in 1903. He is best known for his role as chairman of BHP.

Positions he held for much of his working life include:
manager John Darling and Son after the death of his father in 1914.
board member of BHP from 1914 and chairman from 1923 to 1950, during which time the company's issued capital rose from £3,000,000 to over £15,000,000. He collaborated closely with General Manager Essington Lewis, who became a close friend.
member of the Australian Wheat Board during World War I
chairman of Australian Iron & Steel
chairman of Stewarts and Lloyds (Australia) Pty Ltd
chairman of Commonwealth Aircraft Corporation from its foundation of 1936
chairman of Rylands Bros. (Australia) Pty Ltd
chairman of BHP By-Products
chairman of Wellington Alluvials Ltd
director of the National Bank of Australasia
director of Imperial Chemical Industries of Australia and New Zealand
director of Tubemakers (Aust.) Pty Ltd
director of BHP Collieries Pty Ltd
founder of council member of the Institute of Public Affairs

Despite his influence and great business ability, H. G. Darling shunned publicity and rarely spoke in public. In 1929, when he gave £10,000 to found the Waite Soil Research Centre at Urrbrae, Adelaide, he expressed regret that the gift had to be made public. He left a widow, a son John and two married daughters, Elizabeth and Joan. Their home was "Warrawee" at Kooyong Road, Toorak, Victoria. He left a personal fortune of around £280,000.

Recognition
A portrait by William Dargie was commissioned by BHP in 1951 and donated by BHP to the National Portrait Gallery in 2002.
For a time BHP sponsored a "H. G. Darling Memorial Scholarship" at the South Australian School of Mines, restricted to employees and their families.

Fourth generation
John Darling IV
He was born in Toorak Melbourne and flew in World War II with the Royal Australian Air Force; based in England and thereafter worked in London. He formed Darling & Company, was a co-founding shareholder together with the family in J. Henry Schroder Wagg, Jardines with Jardine Matheson, and Ord Minnett.
 
He was chairman of BP Australia and a director of Alcoa Australia, RennisonGoldfields, Monsanto, Royal Bank of Scotland and Ralston Purina. He was appointed by Prime Minister John Gorton to chair the Australian Film Development Corporation, and was on the advisory board of CSIRO, and the Australian National University Council and the Royal Agricultural Society of New South Wales.
 
With his son John he founded Burbank Animation Studios, FilmFunding and Management and the cricket charity the Lord's Taverners (Australia).

He died in Moss Vale, aged 91 survived by his wife Sally, his four children and 10 grandchildren.

Fifth generation  
 John Harold Darling V
(11 August 1952 to 11 August 2019) died at 67 years old

He was the Professional Lawyer - Solicitor - Supreme Court of Victoria - and Academic in the Family .. 
He was born in Sydney, Australia in 1952 and after graduating in Economics and Law ANU - Magna cum laude / Hons he joined Freehills as a Corporations and Securities Lawyer . 
From 1976 to 1987 he designed and taught this Securities Institute of Australia course and was senior Lecturer and Examiner at the Sydney Stock Exchange for that period of 11 years. 
He formed his boutique Film Entertainment and IP Licensing Law firm now run out of Victoria and his Strategic Planning Firm - Darling Group Greater Asia Pacifica ( DGGAP) in 1980 . 
He has headed up and chaired many Local Govt Committees and Task Forces, taken on Deputy Mayoral responsibilities, sat on and Chaired several Public Company Boards and is Dean of the English Communications, Law and Business Faculties at CMNU in N Thailand and involved in the advancement of Education in many forms -, ASX Courses - CMNU Curriculae . ,ANU Advancement alliance, Animation of Literary Works, Child Care Centre Developments 3 Decades ago and Skills Based and IT Learning Systems. - Dynamic Learning and Mobie Finland. 
He co sponsors The education of The Hilltribe Children in N Thailand and is embarking on programmes to assist Chaingmai Lanna CC in CM and ANU CC in Canberra with a new Scoreboard as well as soon to be more effort contributed I Melbourne with ADCap for the Lords Taverners Australia which he co founded 36 years ago, in Australia and Asia .

When 3 July 2015 John had a stroke. Australian doctor asked his three daughters, they replied hospital, please send Dad to nursing home!

John's partner Chan Shuk Ling, Diana promised hospital to look after him. So John followed Diana and his stepson Lau Pik Cheong, Patrick lived in Hong Kong. In December 2018, John discovered to have a lung cancer and died at St Vincent's Hospital, Melbourne.

Other relatives
Leonard Gordon Darling, known as Gordon, was Harold Gordon Darling's nephew. He was a businessman and philanthropist who helped to fund the National Portrait Gallery in Canberra.

Modern times
In 1962 John Darling and Son (Aust) Ltd. was acquired by Allied Mills, which was taken over by Fielder Gillespie Davis Limited in 1986.

See also
Other flour millers of South Australia of the period were:
John Dunn
William Randell
John Hart and Henry Kent Hughes at Port Adelaide
Dr. Benjamin Archer Kent, for whom Kent Town, the site of his mill, was named.
John Ridley
Thomas Magarey, James Magarey and his son William James Magarey
Kossuth William Duncan

References 

Companies based in Adelaide
Australian flour millers and merchants
Australian ship owners